The Faroe Islands are an archipelago between the Norwegian Sea and the North Atlantic approximately halfway between Norway and Iceland,  north-northwest of mainland Scotland. The islands are an autonomous territory within the Kingdom of Denmark.

Economic troubles caused by a collapse of the Faroese fishing industry in the early 1990s brought high unemployment rates of 10 to 15% by the mid-1990s. Unemployment decreased in the later 1990s, down to about 6% at the end of 1998. By June 2008 unemployment had declined to 1.1%, before rising to 3.4% in early 2009. In December 2014 the unemployment was 3.2%. Nevertheless, the almost total dependence on fishing and fish farming means that the economy remains vulnerable. One of the biggest private companies of the Faroe Islands is the salmon-farming company Bakkafrost, which is the largest of the four salmon-farming companies in the Faroe Islands and the eighth-biggest in the world.

Notable firms 
This list includes notable companies with primary headquarters located in the country. The industry and sector follow the Industry Classification Benchmark taxonomy. Organizations which have ceased operations are included and noted as defunct.

See also

 Economy of the Faroe Islands
 List of banks in the Faroe Islands

References 

 Companies